The Mountaineer Trikes Mite-Lite is a family of American flying wing ultralight trikes that was designed and produced by Mountaineer Trikes. The aircraft were supplied as a kit for amateur construction.

Design and development
It features a cable-braced hang glider-style high-wing, weight-shift controls, a single-seat, open cockpit, tricycle landing gear and a single engine in pusher configuration.

The Mite-Lite is very minimalist lightweight trike, made from bolted-together aluminum tubing, with its single surface wing covered in Dacron sailcloth. Its wing is supported by a single tube-type kingpost and uses an "A" frame control bar. The wing is a large  area and is suitable for power-off soaring flight. The aircraft can be disassembled by one person in 45 minutes for ground transportation on a car top or for storage. The factory standard powerplant supplied with the Mite-Lite was the  Rotax 277 single cylinder, two-stroke aircraft engine.

Production of all models ended when the company went out of business in 1998.

Variants
Mite-Lite
Initial model,  Rotax 277 engine
Solo 175
Improved model,  Rotax 503 engine. 25 reported as flying by 1998.
Dual 175
A Solo 175 with a second seat fitted,  Rotax 503 engine. Ten reported flying by 1998.

Specifications (Mite-Lite)

References

1980s United States ultralight aircraft
Homebuilt aircraft
Single-engined pusher aircraft
Ultralight trikes